This article features the discography of Greek pop, rock, R&B, and dance musician Sakis Rouvas, which includes twelve studio albums, two live albums, and a total of six compilation albums: two greatest hits  albums, one remix compilation album, one ballad compilation, and two box set albums. Furthermore, are three EPs and 12 singles (five of which have been released exclusively to Greece and Cyprus and seven which have been released internationally), as well as six albums that contain video. For video releases, see Sakis Rouvas videography.

Rouvas is among the most successful Greek artists of all-time, having sales of an estimated two million records. All of his albums have achieved certifications of gold or higher in both Greece and Cyprus. Internationally, Rouvas has also scored hits in France, Sweden, Turkey, Bulgaria, North Africa and Russia.

Albums
All the albums listed underneath were released and charted in Greece and Cyprus. Some albums charted internationally.

Studio albums
* denotes unknown or unavailable information.

 Note: Albums without chart positions may have charted but there is no information currently available.

Live albums

1 The sales thresholds do not represent the exact sales of the album, but the traditional amount of sales needed to earn the particular certification.

Official compilations

1 The sales thresholds do not represent the exact sales of the album, but the traditional amount of sales needed to earn the particular certification.

Box sets

Other compilations

Special edition releases
1996: Tora Arhizoun Ta Dyskola (Special edition re-release with remixes).
2001: 21os Akatallilos re-released with 2 bonus remixes.
2002: Ola Kala was re-released in Greece as what is sometimes called the Gold Edition. It was then released as the international edition and the French edition.
2003: Remixes was re-released to contain bonus DVD footage.
2003: Ola Kala was re-released in Europe and France.
2004: Ola Kala was re-released across Europe after Rouvas' success in the Eurovision Song Contest 2004.
2005: S'eho Erotefthi was released as S'eho Erotefthi: Special Edition in longbox format.
2006: Live Ballads: Special Edition was released as a longbox simultaneously with the standard version.
2007: This Is My Live was also released in gift box format.

EPs

Singles

CD singles

2Some singles released for international charts only.
Note: Singles without chart positions may have charted but there is no information currently available.

Full singles discography
 1991–"Par'ta" (Take Them)
 1991–"1992" [=Hilia Enia-Kosia Eneninda-Dyo]
 1992–"Gyrna" (Come Back)
 1992–"Min Andistekese" (Don't Resist)
 1992–"Gia Fantasou" (Come On, Fantasize)
 1993–"Me Kommeni Tin Anasa" (Breathless)
 1993–"Na Ziseis Moro Mou" (Happy Birthday Baby)
 1993–"Kane Me" (Make Me)
 1993–"To Xero Ise Moni" (I Know You Are Alone)
 1994–"Xehase To" (Just Forget It)
 1994–"Aima, Dakrya & Idrotas" (Blood, Sweat & Tears)
 1994–"Xana" (Again)
 1995–"Ela Mou" (Come To Me)
 1995–"Symplegma Idipodio" (Oedipus Complex)
 1995–"Grothia" (Fist)
 1995–"Mia Fora" (For Once)
 1996–"Tora Arhizoun Ta Dyskola" (Now Begin The Difficult Times)
 1996–"Afiste Tin" (Leave Her)
 1996–"Ase Me Na Fygo" (Let Me Leave)
 1996–"Mi M'agapiseis" (Don't Love Me)
 1996–"Pou ke Pote" (When and Where?)
 1997–"Birgün/Otan" (Duet with Burak Kut)
 1997–"Se Thelo, Me Theleis" (I Want You, You Want Me) (Featured with Anna Vissi)
 1998–"Theleis I Den Theleis" (Do You Want to or Not?)
 1998–"I Kardia Mou" (My Heart)
 1999–"Den Ehi Sidera I Kardia Sou" (Your Heart Doesn't Have Rails)
 1999–"O Tropos Pou Kitazi" (The Way She Stares)
 1999–"Ipirhes Panda" (You Existed Always)
 1999–"Ta Aspra Triandafylla" (White Roses)
 2000–"Andexa" (I Endured)
 2000–"Se Thelo San Trelos" (I Want You Like Crazy)
 2000–"Askisi Ipotagis" (Exercise of Obedience)
 2000–"Kanoume Onira" (We're Making Dreams)
 2000–"In'O,ti Kratisa" (It's What I Kept)
 2000–"I Fili ki I Gnosti" (Friends and Acquaintances)
 2000–"Delfinaki" (Little Dolphin)
 2000–"Akatallilos" (X-Rated)
 2000–"Andexa" (Club Mix)
 2001–"Disco Girl"
 2002–"Disco Girl" (English Version)
 2002–"Ola Kala" (Everything Is Fine)
 2002–"Mia Zoi Mazi" (One Life Together)
 2002–"Ola Kala" (English Version)
 2002–"Oso Zo" (As Long As I Live)
 2002–"Iparheis" (You Exist)
 2002–"The Light" (English Version of "Mia Zoe Mazi")
 2003–"Pes Tis" (Tell Her) (Greek Version of the English Hit "Feelings")
 2003–"Dis Lui" (Tell Her) (French Version of the English Hit "Feelings")
 2003–"Feelings"
 2003–"I'll Give You My Heart"
 2003–"To Hrono Stamatao" (I'm Stopping Time)
 2003–"To Koritsi Ekino" (The Girl Over There)
 2004–"Shake It" (One of the most successful singles in Greek History; 47 weeks on singles' charts)
 2004–"Ise Ta Panda" (You Are Everything)
 2004–"Se Kathe Anapnoi" (With Every Deep Breath)
 2004–"Se Thelo San Trelos" (I Want You Like Crazy) (Duet with Philip Kirkorov)
 2004–"Kak Shumacheshki Ya" (Russian Version of "Se Thelo San Trelos") (Duet with Philip Kirkorov)
 2004–"Hronia Polla" (Happy New Year)
 2005–"S'eho Erotefthi" (I've Fallen In Love With You)
 2005–"Na M'agapas" (You Should Love Me)
 2005–"Cairo"
 2005–"Hartini Zoi" (Paper Life)
 2005–"Spasmena Filia" (Shattered Kisses) (Greek Version of "I'll Give You My Heart")
 2005–"Hilia Milia" (1000 Milies)
 2005–"Mila Tis" (Talk To Her)
 2006–"Agapa Me" (Love Me)
 2006–"Na M'agapas" (Alternate Version)
 2006–"O,ti Onirevomoun" (Whatever I Dreamed)
 2006–"18 (Yparhi Agape Edo)" [=Deka-ohto] (There Is Love Here)
 2006–"Ego Travao Zori" (I'm Under Pressure)
 2007–"Ola Gyro Sou Gyrizoun" (Everything Revolves Around You)
 2007–"Zise Ti Zoi" (Live Life)
 2007–"One With This World"
 2007–"Suspicious Minds"
 2007–"Stous 31 Dromous" (On The 31 Roads)
 2008–"+ Se Thelo" (And I Want You)
 2008–"Irthes" (You Came)
 2009–"This Is Our Night"
 2009–"Spase To Hrono" (Shatter time)
 2010–"Emena Thes" (I am the one you want)
 2010–"Parafora" (Madly)
 2011–"Yparxei Elpida" (There is Hope)
 2011–"Oi Dio Mas" (the two of us)
 2012–"Kane Na Min S'Agapiso" (Make me not love you)
 2012–"Tora" (Now)
 2014–"Pio Psila" (Higher)
 2015–"Radiofona" (Radio)
 2015–"Fila me" (Kiss me)
 2015–"Dio Theoi" (Two Gods)
 2016–"Ola" (All)
 2017–"Zitima  Zois" (Matter of Life)
 2019–"Ela Sto Horo" (Come Dance)
 2019–"Amartolos"

Original soundtracks
Rouvas contributed music to the following soundtracks:

Videography

International discography

Albums
2002: Ola Kala
2005: I'm in Love With You (S'eho Erotefthi)

Singles
2002: "Disco Girl"
2002: "Ola Kala"
2002: "The Light"
2003: "Feelings"
2003: "Dis Lui"
2004: "Shake It"
2009: "Keep On Moving"
2009: "This Is Our Night"

International music videos
1996: "Birgün/Otan" (With Burak Kut)
2002: "Disco Girl" (English Version)
2002: "Ola Kala" (Stereodrome Remix) (English Version)
2003: "Feelings"
2003: "Dis Lui"
2004: "Shake It" (International Version)
2004: "Se Thelo San Trelos" (With Philipp Kirkorov)
2004: "Se Thelo San Trelos/Kak Sumacheshkij Ya" (With Philipp Kirkorov)
2004: "Kak Sumacheshkij Ya" (With Philipp Kirkorov)

International charts

Albums
Ola Kala
 French Albums Chart No. 132

CD singles
"Disco Girl"
 French Singles Chart No. 79

"Dis lui"
 French Singles Chart No. 63

Shake It!"
 Swedish Singles Chart No. 32

"Se Thelo San Trelos"
 Russian Airplay Chart #20

"This Is Our Night"
 Russian Airplay Chart #265

References

External links
Official website

Discography
Discographies of Greek artists
Pop music discographies
Rock music discographies
Rhythm and blues discographies